The Coelho AC-11 (also called the AC.11 and AC 11) is a Brazilian homebuilt aircraft that was designed and produced by Altair Coelho of Eldorado do Sul and introduced in 1994. The aircraft was intended to be supplied as a kit for amateur construction, but only one was completed.

Design and development
The aircraft features a V-strut-braced low-wing, a two-seats-in-side-by-side configuration enclosed cockpit, fixed tricycle landing gear or optionally conventional landing gear and a single engine in tractor configuration.

The aircraft fuselage is made from welded  steel tube, while the wing is plywood, with some surfaces covered in doped aircraft fabric and some covered in plywood.

The manufacturer estimated the construction time of the prototype as 1600 hours.

Operational history
By 1998 the company reported that one conventional gear version of the aircraft was completed and flying, while a tricycle gear version was under construction.

Specifications (AC-11)

References

External links

AC-11
1990s Brazilian sport aircraft
1990s Brazilian ultralight aircraft
1990s Brazilian civil utility aircraft
Single-engined tractor aircraft
Low-wing aircraft
Homebuilt aircraft